Anostostoma is the type genus of the family Anostostomatidae and consists of five species of insect, endemic to Australia.

Included species 
 Anostostoma australasiae Gray, 1837
 Anostostoma erinaceum (Burmeister, 1838)
 Anostostoma femorale Walker, 1869
 Anostostoma opacum Brunner von Wattenwyl, 1888
 Anostostoma spinosum Karny, 1930

Formerly included 
 Stenopelmatus toltecus (Saussure, 1861)

References 

Weta
Ensifera genera
Anostostomatidae